Pseudoplesiopinae is a subfamily of the family Pseudochromidae, the dottybacks, it consists of small species of coral-reef inhabiting fish which are distributed  throughout the Indo-Pacific.

Characteristics
Workers have established that this subfamily is monophyletic. They have a pelvic fin which has a single spine and three or four unbranched soft rays, their heads are covered in scales,  most of the rays in their dorsal fins are simple, they have teeth on the palatine bone; their pectoral fins have 17–19 rays and the lateral line has one anterior-pored scale.

Genera
The following genera are included in the subfamily Pseudoplesiopinae:

 Amsichthys A.C. Gill & A.J. Edwards, 1999
 Chlidichthys J.L.B. Smith, 1953
 Lubbockichthys A.C. Gill & A.J. Edwards, 1999
 Pectinochromis A.C. Gill & A.J. Edwards, 1999
 Pseudoplesiops Bleeker, 1858

References

 
Pseudochromidae
Taxa named by Pieter Bleeker